The 1924–25 season was the thirtieth season in which Dundee competed at a Scottish national level, playing in Division One, where they would finish in 8th place. Dundee would also compete in the Scottish Cup, where they would make it all the way to the final for the second time in their history. Despite David McLean putting the Dee ahead at half-time, they would concede two late goals and be defeated in the final by Celtic.

Scottish Division One 

Statistics provided by Dee Archive.

League table

Scottish Cup 

Statistics provided by Dee Archive.

Player Statistics 
Statistics provided by Dee Archive

|}

See also 

 List of Dundee F.C. seasons

References

External links 

 1919-20 Dundee season on Fitbastats

Dundee F.C. seasons
Dundee